Angelo Moniz da Silva Ferraz, the Baron of Uruguaiana (3 November 1812 - 18 January 1867) was a Brazilian magistrate and politician. He served as Prime Minister of Brazil from August 10, 1859 to March 2, 1861.

Biography
He graduated from the Faculty of Law at Olinda in 1834, and was soon thereafter appointed prosecutor in Salvador, later becoming a judge in Jacobina.

He was elected several times, as provincial deputy in Bahia in 1838, then general deputy between 1843 and 1856 and senator between 1856 and 1866. He was made court customs inspector in 1848 and judge of the Treasury in 1853.

He was governor of Rio Grande do Sul from October 16, 1857 to April 22, 1859, President of the Council of Ministers (Prime Minister), from August 10, 1859 to March 2, 1861, Finance Minister from August 10, 1859 to March 2, 1861, and Minister of War from 1865 to 1866.

While Minister of War, he was adjutant to Emperor Pedro II during the surrender of Paraguayan Colonel Estigarribia, in the city of Uruguaiana, on September 18, 1865 during the Paraguayan War. In commemoration of this episode, he was awarded the title of Baron of Uruguaiana in 1866.

As Finance Minister (a position he took on together with the Presidency of the Council of Ministers), he pursued a policy of developing internal and customs revenues. His management of the  national finances was characterized by the creation of the Department of Agriculture, Commerce and Public Works; the organization of savings banks; regulation of issuing banks and money supply; introduction of accountability of those responsible to the National Treasury; and compulsory civil service examinations.

References

1812 births
1867 deaths
Prime Ministers of Brazil
Foreign ministers of Brazil
Governors of Rio Grande do Sul
Finance Ministers of Brazil
Defence ministers of Brazil
People from Bahia
Brazilian nobility
Members of the Senate of the Empire of Brazil
Members of the Chamber of Deputies (Empire of Brazil)